Green Valley is an unincorporated community in Knox County, in the U.S. state of Ohio.

History
Green Valley was originally called Newcomerstown, and under the latter name was founded by Cromwell Newcomer, and named for him.

References

Unincorporated communities in Knox County, Ohio
Unincorporated communities in Ohio